Juan Vargas (born 31 July 1963) is a Salvadoran judoka. He competed at the 1984, 1992 and the 1996 Summer Olympics.

References

External links
 

1963 births
Living people
Salvadoran male judoka
Olympic judoka of El Salvador
Judoka at the 1984 Summer Olympics
Judoka at the 1992 Summer Olympics
Judoka at the 1996 Summer Olympics
Place of birth missing (living people)